Roseville is a central-northern suburb of Pretoria, South Africa.

References

Suburbs of Pretoria